George Mansel Nicholson (1874–?) was a justice of the Oklahoma Supreme Court from 1921 to 1927, serving as chief justice from 1925 to 1927.

Early life
George M. Nicholson was born May 30, 1874, to George E. Nicholson, a native of Carthage, Missouri, and a Methodist minister, and his wife, Ida Carpenter, a native of Muscatine, Iowa. They moved to Riley County, Kansas, shortly before their son was born, his elementary education was in the public schools there. He quit school when he was 15 years old, so he could support himself as a farm hand. Concurrently, he started reading law in the office of Thomas Beery in Ness City, Kansas. A diligent student, he passed the bar exam in 1894. George practiced law in Ness City until 1898, when he moved to Lincoln, Nebraska." He remained there until 1903, when he moved to the town of Sulphur in the Chickasaw Nation, of the Indian Territory (now Sulphur, Oklahoma). Before Oklahoma became a state in November 1907, George M. served as City Attorney of Sulphur. The Nicholsons lived in Sulphur, along with their four children.

Nicholson was appointed as Associate Justice of the Oklahoma Supreme Court in 1922, serving in the court's District 2 until 1927. He served as chief justice in 1926-27. After retiring from the court, he opened a private law practice in Oklahoma City in 1927.

Personal

Family
In 1903, George M. Nicholson married Miss Julia Sheldon of Trinidad, Colorado, in Tecumseh, Oklahoma.They had four children. Julie died in 1919. George married Edith Cole on July 21, 1927.

Memberships
George M. Nicholson belongs to :
 Member, Murray Co, Bar Association;
 Oklahoma State Bar Association;
 American Bar Association;
 Methodist church
 Republican

References

Justices of the Oklahoma Supreme Court
Oklahoma lawyers
Oklahoma Republicans
1874 births
Date of death missing
Place of death missing
People from Riley County, Kansas
People from Sulphur, Oklahoma
Methodists from Oklahoma
U.S. state supreme court judges admitted to the practice of law by reading law